Ivaylo Vasilev may refer to:

 Ivaylo Vasilev (footballer born 1991), Bulgarian football goalkeeper for Levski Sofia
 Ivaylo Vasilev (footballer born 1987), Bulgarian football defender for Akademik Sofia